General elections were held in Haiti between 16 December 1990 and 20 January 1991. The presidential election, held on 16 December, resulted in a victory for Jean-Bertrand Aristide of the National Front for Change and Democracy (FCND). The FCND also won the parliamentary elections for which voter turnout was 50.8%.  It was widely reckoned as the first honest election held in Haiti since the country declared independence in 1804.

Aristide was sworn in on 7 February but was deposed in a coup eight months later.

Background
For the elections, the United Nations General Assembly had established the United Nations Observer Group for the Verification of the Elections in Haiti (ONUVEH), which sent election monitors, as did the Organization of American States. These organisations helped ensure that the elections were free and fair.

Results

President

Chamber of Deputies

Senate

The elected members were:
Artibonite: Thomas Eddy Dupiton, Déjean Belizaire, Serge Joseph, Artibonite
Centre: Serge Gilles, Hérard Pauyo, Smith Metelus, 
Grand-Anse: Robert Opont, Bernard Sansaricq, Yvon Ghislain
Nord: Rony Mondestin, Edrice Raymond, Raoul Remy
Nord-Est:  Firmin Jean-Louis, Judnel Jean, Amos Andre
Nord-Ouest: Luc Fleurinord, Ebrané Cadet, Art L. Austin
Ouest: Jacques Clarck Parent, Turneb Delpe, Wesner Emmanuel
Sud: Julio Larosiliere, Franck Leonard, Frahner Jean-Baptiste
Sud-Est: Guy Bauduy, Jean-Robert Martinez, Alberto Joseph

References

Elections in Haiti
1990 in Haiti
1991 in Haiti
Haiti
Haiti
Presidential elections in Haiti
Election and referendum articles with incomplete results